Fennerogalathea is a genus of squat lobsters in the family Galatheidae, containing the following species:
 Fennerogalathea chacei Baba, 1988
 Fennerogalathea chirostyloides Tirmizi & Javed, 1993

References

Squat lobsters